Recreation Park was the name applied to several former baseball parks in San Francisco, California in the late 19th century and early 20th century.

Recreation Grounds, opened on November 26, 1868, and operated until May 1884, and was San Francisco's first professional enclosed ballpark.  Located at the terminus of a railcar line in San Francisco's heavily Irish Mission District, at the present day Garfield Square.  The ballpark was bordered by the streets Harrison, Twenty-Sixth, Folsom and Twenty-Fifth.  The opening day ceremonies included the second game of the California baseball championship series between the Oakland Wide Awakes and the San Francisco Eagles, who won by the score of 37–23.  The day's festivities included an operatic concert and footraces and were attended by a crowd of 4,000 people.  Photo.

Haight-Street Recreation Grounds 1886 -1895.  Another recreation grounds existed in the Haight, with ownership transferred to J.B. Gilbert of the Central league on September 8, 1893. and was also referred to as Haight-Street Recreation Park located between Stanyan, Waller, Cole and Frederic Streets was closed in 1895.

Most of the ballpark, on a Sanborn map, 1889

Central Park, also sometimes called Recreation Park, seating capacity of 15,000, opened on Thanksgiving Day of 1884 and operated until 1906.   Located at 8th Street and Market Streets, was used by several clubs including the San Francisco Seals of the Pacific Coast League from 1903.  Destroyed by the earthquake and fire on April 18, 1906. The Seals temporarily moved to Oakland while the city of San Francisco was being rebuilt. Photo.

Sanborn map showing Central Park, 1887
Sanborn map showing Central Park, 1899

Recreation Park opened in September 1897 for local baseball and football. An early event was the Cal-Stanford Big Game that November. The hastily constructed stands suffered a partial collapse, but there were no fatalities. The following spring, the San Francisco Olympics, also known as the Athletics and the Brewers, began operating in the California League. The ball club lasted through the 1901 season. In 1903, the San Francisco Seals began their long run in the Pacific Coast League. They played at this ballpark until the 1906 San Francisco earthquake put them out of business for a while.

The ballpark was located on a block bounded by 8th Street (northeast, first base); Harrison Street (southeast, third base); Gordon Street (southwest, left field); and Ringold Street (northwest, right field).

1899 Sanborn map showing the ballpark

Recreation Park, located in the Mission District , was the best known and longest-lived of these ballparks. It was the home of the Seals during 1907–13 and then 1915–30 after a one-year experiment playing at newly built Ewing Park near the Richmond District. The experiment was a fiasco, largely because of the cold and foggy summer weather endemic to western San Francisco. The Oaks, in turn, had essentially moved into Recreation Park in 1907 and played most of their games there (except Thursdays and Sunday mornings) until their new Oaks Park was opened in 1913, although they continued to play some games in San Francisco until sometime in the 1920s. This congenial arrangement was made easier by the fact that J. Cal Ewing, founding father of the PCL, owned both clubs for their first couple of decades. The ballpark sat 15,000. It also become the home of the Mission Reds (a.k.a. "Missions") upon their arrival in 1926.

The Chicago White Sox held spring training at Recreation Park in 1909 and 1910.

This final incarnation of Recreation Park was on a block bounded by 14th Street (north, right field); Valencia Street (east, first base); 15th Street (south, third base); and Guerrero Street (west, left field) . The stands were an unusual design, with a small lower deck topped directly above (thus protected from the weather) by a large upper deck, much of which was unroofed and open to the sunshine and the elements. The stands were also made of wood. A new, concrete ballpark called Seals Stadium, less than a mile east of Recreation Park, opened in 1931 as the new home of both the Seals and the Missions. Recreation Park was demolished and the site was converted into a public housing project.

1914 Sanborn map showing the ballpark

See also

List of baseball parks in San Francisco, California
List of baseball parks in Oakland, California

References

Further reading
Ballparks of North America, Michael Benson, McFarland, 1989, p. 362-363
Take Me Out to the Ball Park, Lowell Reidenbaugh, The Sporting News, 1983 & 1987 p. 256
Lost Ballparks, Lawrence S. Ritter, Viking Studio Books, 1992, p. 169-170

External links
early years before upper deck was extended
1927 game-action photo
1931 Aerial View showing Recreation Park (toward upper left) and then-new Seals Stadium (toward lower right)]
 1887 photo of the Haight and Stanyan baseball park.
 undated photo of Recreation Grounds baseball

Baseball venues in California
Chicago White Sox
Mission District, San Francisco
Demolished sports venues in California
History of San Francisco
Buildings and structures destroyed in the 1906 San Francisco earthquake